Lance Whitnall (born 23 August 1979) is a former Australian rules footballer, and a former captain of the Carlton Football Club.

Early career (1997–1999)
Debuting in 1997 as a 17-year-old, the young Whitnall was recruited in the 1996 AFL Draft under the father-son rule, with his father Graeme having played 66 games for Carlton in the 1970s and 1980s.

The young red-headed, freckled Whitnall, known as "Banger", "Big Red" or simply "Red", quickly established himself in Carlton's best 22, kicking four goals on debut, and missing only a handful of games in 1997 and playing every game in 1998 and 1999. He became a vital part of Carlton's forward line, and in Round 17, 1998 against the Western Bulldogs, the then-19-year-old Whitnall became one of the youngest players to kick 8 goals in a game. It was in this match that he well and truly had established his presence. Whitnall finished with 46 goals for the 1998 season, followed by 55 goals in 1999.

Mid-career (2000–2003)
In 2000 Whitnall had his best ever season when he kicked 70 goals, including his career best 9.4 against Brisbane in Round 16, and was named in the All-Australian Team.

However, From there, the talented Whitnall had suffered a number of setbacks in his career, with ongoing injury and weight problems.

Late career (2004–2007)
In 2005, Whitnall turned around his previous weight problems and came out looking as fit as he had ever been. He performed very well during 2005 and 2006, playing predominantly as the senior member of the Blues' young backline. He capped off a solid 2006 with victory in the Blues' best and fairest (the John Nicholls Medal), and at the age of 27, Whitnall became the second youngest Carlton player (after Robert Walls) to play 200 AFL games.

A long-term member of the leadership team, and widely regarded as having one of the best football brains in the game, Whitnall first took over the captaincy of the team during Anthony Koutoufides' hand injury in 2006, and became the full-time captain in 2007 after Koutoufides relinquished the position. However he struggled in 2007 with ongoing problems with a degenerative condition in his knee. At the completion of the 2007 season, concerns by the club about his degenerative knee being able to stand up to the pressures of AFL football forced Whitnall into retirement, bringing his 11-season, 216 game career at Carlton to an end at 28 years of age.

Statistics

|- style="background-color: #EAEAEA"
! scope="row" style="text-align:center" | 1997
|
| 8 || 18 || 19 || 15 || 123 || 55 || 178 || 71 || 7 || 7 || 1.1 || 0.8 || 6.8 || 3.1 || 9.9 || 3.9 || 0.4 || 0.4 || 0
|- 
! scope="row" style="text-align:center" | 1998
|
| 8 || 22 || 46 || 34 || 229 || 114 || 343 || 148 || 23 || 46 || 2.1 || 1.5 || 10.4 || 5.2 || 15.6 || 6.7 || 1.0 || 2.1 || 8
|- style="background-color: #EAEAEA"
! scope="row" style="text-align:center" | 1999
|
| 8 || 26 || 55 || 36 || 266 || 118 || 384 || 191 || 22 || 81 || 2.1 || 1.4 || 10.2 || 4.5 || 14.8 || 7.3 || 0.8 || 3.1 || 0
|- 
! scope="row" style="text-align:center" | 2000
|
| 8 || 25 || 70 || 45 || 296 || 95 || 391 || 208 || 35 || 62 || 2.8 || 1.8 || 11.8 || 3.8 || 15.6 || 8.3 || 1.4 || 2.5 || 9
|- style="background-color: #EAEAEA"
! scope="row" style="text-align:center" | 2001
|
| 8 || 21 || 37 || 21 || 226 || 76 || 302 || 146 || 27 || 41 || 1.8 || 1.0 || 10.8 || 3.6 || 14.4 || 7.0 || 1.3 || 2.0 || 2
|- 
! scope="row" style="text-align:center" | 2002
|
| 8 || 14 || 28 || 17 || 162 || 45 || 207 || 103 || 15 || 41 || 2.0 || 1.2 || 11.6 || 3.2 || 14.8 || 7.4 || 1.1 || 2.9 || 3
|- style="background-color: #EAEAEA"
! scope="row" style="text-align:center" | 2003
|
| 8 || 12 || 11 || 11 || 137 || 42 || 179 || 73 || 13 || 26 || 0.9 || 0.9 || 11.4 || 3.5 || 14.9 || 6.1 || 1.1 || 2.2 || 0
|- 
! scope="row" style="text-align:center" | 2004
|
| 8 || 19 || 24 || 14 || 141 || 61 || 202 || 75 || 18 || 52 || 1.3 || 0.7 || 7.4 || 3.2 || 10.6 || 3.9 || 0.9 || 2.7 || 0
|- style="background-color: #EAEAEA"
! scope="row" style="text-align:center" | 2005
|
| 8 || 22 || 24 || 21 || 229 || 110 || 339 || 139 || 20 || 49 || 1.1 || 1.0 || 10.4 || 5.0 || 15.4 || 6.3 || 0.9 || 2.2 || 5
|- 
! scope="row" style="text-align:center" | 2006
|
| 8 || 22 || 15 || 8 || 284 || 130 || 414 || 177 || 26 || 23 || 0.7 || 0.4 || 12.9 || 5.9 || 18.8 || 8.0 || 1.2 || 1.0 || 5
|- style="background-color: #EAEAEA"
! scope="row" style="text-align:center" | 2007
|
| 8 || 15 || 19 || 16 || 148 || 54 || 202 || 86 || 15 || 22 || 1.3 || 1.1 || 9.9 || 3.6 || 13.5 || 5.7 || 1.0 || 1.5 || 0
|- class="sortbottom"
! colspan=3| Career
! 216
! 348
! 238
! 2241
! 900
! 3141
! 1417
! 221
! 450
! 1.6
! 1.1
! 10.4
! 4.2
! 14.5
! 6.6
! 1.0
! 2.1
! 32
|}

Post-AFL career
Whitnall was recruited by NTFL side the Palmerston Magpies after being delisted by Carlton and played in two of the club's matches in the 2007/08 season, kicking several goals.

In the 2008 winter season, Whitnall returned to play for original club Lalor in the NFL. He played there in 2008 and 2009. In 2010, Whitnall shifted to the EDFL's Craigieburn Football Club where he served as playing assistant coach for two seasons; in 2011, Whitnall was the EDFL's A-Grade leading goalkicker, after kicking fourteen goals in the final round to secure the title. Whitnall finished his playing career at Glenroy, also in the EDFL, and also coached there from 2012 until 2015. He has been in an assistant coaching role at the Calder Cannons in the TAC Cup since 2016.

Whitnall also played cricket at a suburban level for the Lalor Warriors Cricket Club in the North Metro Cricket Association, where he was an opening or top order batsman, and was on the club's committee until 2016.

In 2017, Whitnall returned to play football for the Division 3 NFL side, Laurimar Power Football Club, where he was their leading goal kicker, kicking 29 goals for the season.

In 2021, Whitnall became Division 6 champion playing lawn bowls for Brunswick Bowls Club.

References

External links 

Lance Whitnall at the Carlton Football Club website 

Lance Whitnall profile in Blueseum

1979 births
Living people
Carlton Football Club players
All-Australians (AFL)
John Nicholls Medal winners
Palmerston Football Club players
Australian rules footballers from Victoria (Australia)
Northern Knights players
Lalor Football Club players
Preston Football Club (VFA) players